Johann Samuel Schroeter or Schröter (2 March 1753  – 2 November 1788) was a German pianist and composer, active in London from 1772.

Life
Schröter was born in Guben to Johann Friedrich Schröter (1724–1811), an oboist for Augustus III of Poland, the Elector of Saxony, and his wife Marie Regine Hefter (died 1766); the family were brought up as musicians, with Corona Schröter being his elder sister. After 1763 they were in Leipzig and taught by Johann Adam Hiller. In 1771 and 1772 they were in London, where Johann Samuel Schröter remained.

Initially organist at the Royal German Chapel, Schröter became a protege of Johann Christian Bach. With connections to court, he became a celebrated pianist. In 1782, after Bach's death, he became music-master to the Queen. He fell ill by 1786 and died in 1788.

Works
Through William Napier of Strand, London and others, Schröter published a range of compositions. They included piano and flute/violin sonatas, and piano trios.

Family
In 1775, Schröter married, against the family's wishes, Rebecca Scott, daughter of the late Robert Scott (died 1771), a merchant, and his wife Elizabeth. The match led to litigation over Rebecca's marriage portion.

Notes

External links
 

1753 births
1788 deaths
German pianists
18th-century German composers
People from Guben
Musicians from London